Yellowtail, yellow-tail, or Yellow Tail may refer to:

 Yellowtail (fish), any of several species of fish
 Yellow-tail, a Eurasian moth species
 Yellowtail moth, a South American moth species
 Yellow Tail (wine), an Australian wine producer
 Yellow Tail Records, a record label
 Yellowtail cribo, a snake species

People with the surname
 Robert Yellowtail (1889–1988), Crow Nation leader
 Susie Walking Bear Yellowtail (1903–1981), Crow nurse
 Thomas Yellowtail (1903–1993), Crow sun dance chief and medicine man